Peniston (and spelling variants) may refer to:

People

Peniston
Surname
 CeCe Peniston (born 1969), American dance music singer
 Cherylin Peniston (born 1948), legislator in the U.S. state of Colorado
 James Peniston (born 1973), American sculptor
 Jared Peniston (born 1982), Bermudian football player
 Robert C. Peniston (1922–2014), former captain of the battleship USS New Jersey
Ryan Peniston (born 1995), British tennis player

Given name
 Peniston Booth (1691–1765), 18th-century Anglican priest
 Peniston Lamb, 1st Viscount Melbourne (1745–1828), British politician
 His son Peniston Lamb (1770–1805), also a British politician
 Peniston Powney (c. 1699–1757), British landowner and politician

Penniston
S. Dell Penniston, American farmer and politician
Thomas Penniston, early 18th century privateer

Penyston
Sir Thomas Penyston, 1st Baronet, English MP

See also
Penistone, small town in South Yorkshire, England